Lake Cathie  is a town in New South Wales, Australia about 15 minutes drive south of Port Macquarie.

The Birpai (also known as Birrbay) people have lived in this area for more than 40,000 years.

Commercial area
The town is a popular holiday destination on the Mid North Coast because of its tranquil location which hosts the lake, lagoon and beaches. It has a Woolworths supermarket, local Tavern, Lake Cathie Bowling Club, bakery, fish & chip shop, coffee shop, pharmacy, post office, a newsagent and a bargain shop. Its main feature is a tidal lake fed by the ocean daily. Several times throughout the year the lake is closed over by shifting sands and becomes dark in colour due to the tannins in the local flora. Tourism centres on the lake as it is a popular swimming and fishing spot all year round especially when the lake is open.

Population
According to the 2016 Australian census, there were 4,296 people in Lake Cathie.
 Aboriginal and Torres Strait Islander people made up 4.8% of the population. 
 86.4% of people were born in Australia. The next most common country of birth was England at 4.4%.
 94.6% of people spoke only English at home. 
 The most common responses for religion were No Religion at 38.0%, Anglican at 21.3% and Catholic at 21.1%.

Notable people
 Trent Milton (born 1972), Paralympic snowboarder

See also 

 List of World's Largest Roadside Attractions

References

External links 
http://members.optusnet.com.au/~fjcorker/lakecathie/lakecathiehistory.html
http://lakecathie.com/ - Lake Cathie Fishing Club
https://web.archive.org/web/20050716223943/http://www.dlwc.nsw.gov.au/care/water/estuaries/inventory/tidaldata/innes.html - Lake Innes and Lake Cathie, Estuaries of NSW

Towns in New South Wales
Mid North Coast
Coastal towns in New South Wales